Henry Ferguson, or Vergazon (1665 – 1730), was a Dutch Golden Age painter.

Biography
He was born in The Hague as the son of William Gowe Ferguson. He worked for a short time in England, because Horace Walpole wrote that he was "a Dutch painter of ruins and landscapes, with which he sometimes was called to adorn the backgrounds of Kneller's pictures, though his colouring was reckoned too dark. He painted a few small portraits, and died in France".
He travelled with Adriaen van der Kabel via Lyon to Toulouse, where he later died.

References

Henry Ferguson on Artnet
Blog about his painting with ruins that was purchased for the Rijksmuseum in 2009 on David Packwood's "Art History Today"

1665 births
1730 deaths
Dutch Golden Age painters
Dutch male painters
Artists from The Hague